Fabio Adobati (born 8 April 1988) is an Italian football defender who plays for Tritium Calcio 1908.

Career
On 18 October 2019 it was confirmed, that Adobati had joined Serie D club Tritium Calcio 1908.

Domestic League Records

References

External links
 
 

1988 births
Sportspeople from the Province of Bergamo
Living people
Italian footballers
Association football defenders
Como 1907 players
A.C. Renate players
Forlì F.C. players
U.S. Ciserano players
Tritium Calcio 1908 players
Serie C players
Serie D players
Footballers from Lombardy